What's Inside: Songs from Waitress''' is the fifth studio album by American singer-songwriter Sara Bareilles, released on November 6, 2015, through Epic Records. The lead single from the album, "She Used to Be Mine", was released digitally on September 25, 2015. It features songs from the musical Waitress, for which Bareilles wrote the music and lyrics.

Background
In June 2013, it was reported that Bareilles was to score Waitress, a musical adaptation of the 2007 film of the same name. The musical opened on August 20, 2015 at the American Repertory Theater in Cambridge, Massachusetts. The production was directed by Diane Paulus and starred Jessie Mueller in the leading role. Bareilles debuted one song from the musical called "She Used to be Mine" during some shows on her Little Black Dress Tour. The show closed on September 27, 2015, and after the successful run at A.R.T., it moved to the Brooks Atkinson Theatre on Broadway in April 2016. Previews began in March 2016 with Mueller retaining the lead. Bareilles took over the lead from Mueller for a 10-week limited run, which began on March 31, 2017, and returned from January 16 to March 11, 2018, with an overlap with Jason Mraz.

While writing the musical, Bareilles "fell more deeply in love with the writing of the musical Waitress than I had ever imagined." Her decision to record an album of the songs came because it "proved impossible for me to imagine handing over the songs to the show before selfishly finding a way to sing them myself." She confirmed during a Google Hangout Q & A session in June 2015 that the musical's songs would be reworked "to sound like Sara Bareilles songs."

Recording
Bareilles began work on the album in April 2015 at New York City's Electric Lady Studios with producer Neal Avron, who previously worked with Bareilles on Kaleidoscope Heart.

Promotion
On June 27, 2015, Bareilles and Nadia DiGiallonardo performed "She Used to Be Mine" with Rich Dworsky and The Berkshire Boys on A Prairie Home Companion. The album's title was revealed in September 2015.

Critical reception

Stephen Thomas Erlewine of AllMusic rated the album four out of five stars and writes that the songs are "lively, clever, and bold, and further evidence of Bareilles' versatility, elegance, and wit." Additionally, The Boston Globes Sarah Rodman calls it "a great pop album."

Commercial performanceWhat's Inside: Songs from Waitress'' debuted at number ten on the US Billboard 200 chart, earning 30,000 album-equivalent units, (including pure album sales of 27,000 copies) in its first week. This became Barellies' fifth US top-ten album.

Track listing

Personnel
Credits adapted from AllMusic.

Musicians
 Sara Bareilles – piano, vocals
 Neal Avron – cello
 Kallie Ciechomski – violin
 Jack Daley – bass
 Christine DiGiallonardo – background vocals
 Daniela DiGiallonardo – background vocals
 Nadia DiGiallonardo – piano, background vocals
 Yair Evnine – viola
 Rich Mercurio – drums
 Blake Mills – guitar
 Jason Mraz – vocals
 Lee Nadel – bass
 Jared Scharff – guitar
 Aaron Sterling – drums
 Zachary Rae – keyboards

Technical
 Neal Avron – engineer, mixing, production
 Vira Byramji – assistant engineer
 Yair Evnine – string arrangements
 Ted Jensen – mastering
 Phil Joly – assistant engineer
 Shervin Lainey – photography
 Scott Skrzynski – assistant engineer, mixing assistant
 Erich Talaba – engineer
 Elizabeth Ziman – string arrangements

Charts

References

2015 albums
Sara Bareilles albums
Epic Records albums
Albums recorded at Electric Lady Studios
Albums produced by Neal Avron